Introducing Doug Raney is the debut album by jazz guitarist Doug Raney recorded in 1977 and released on the Danish label, SteepleChase.

Reception 

Scott Yanow of AllMusic states Raney has "a swinging style and light tone just slightly heavier than that of his father" calling it "An impressive debut".

Track listing

Personnel 
 Doug Raney – guitar
 Duke Jordan – piano
 Hugo Rasmussen – double bass
 Billy Hart – drums

References 

Doug Raney albums
1978 albums
SteepleChase Records albums